Carrier Air Wing Ten (CVW-10) were two separate carrier air wings of the United States Navy that existed during the Cold War.  The first CVW-10 was originally known as CVG-10 and was established in 1950 before being disestablished in November 1969. The second and much shorter lived one was established in 1986 but due to budgets after one workups cruise, it was disestablished in 1988 along with all of its squadrons.

History

Early years (1950–1964) 
Carrier Air Group 10 was established on May 1, 1950, but did not see a deployment until 1952 on board the USS Lake Champlain. Although CVG-10 didn't take part in the Korean War, it still did see more deployments in years to come, taking part in nine more deployments before the decade's end, including on board the U.S. Navy's first super carrier, the USS Forrestal during the Lebanon crisis in 1958 before moving to the smaller Essex in mid-1959. As part of the Navy-wide renaming scheme, CVG-10 became Carrier Air Wing 10 on December 20, 1963.

Vietnam and end of first CVW-10 (1965–1969) 
CVW-10 made another deployment on Shangri-La in 1965 as well as minor deployment on board USS Intrepid (CVS-11) in early 1966 before in April being deployed to the Gulf of Tonkin on board Intrepid again to take part in the Vietnam War. After leaving in November of that year, CVW-10 returned to Vietnam two more times in 1967 and 1968 before returning in February 1969 before being decommissioned on November 29.

Second CVW-10 (1986–1988) 
As part of Ronald Reagan's plan to build a 600-ship Navy, CVW-13 and CVW-10 were reestablished in the 1980s, with CVW-10 becoming a west coast CVW on November 1, 1986 (CVW-13 took the old tail code of CVW-10 which was AK). Originally VFA-195 flying the F/A-18A Hornet was to join CVW-10 as the VFA (Strike Fighter) squadron based on images with VFA-195 with the NM tail code in 1986. VFA-161 and VFA-195 would, however, switch places at NAS Fallon with photographic evidence showing both squadrons at there. VFA-161 was later removed from CVW-5 and would not return to Japan after transition training was completed on Hornet and would be placed in to inactive status joining CVW-10 while VFA-195 went to NAF Atusgi to join CVW-5. 

After, this due to the warming relations between the Soviet Union and the United States as well as budget cuts, CVW-10 was decommissioned for the final time on September 30, 1988. All of CVW-10's squadrons also were decommissioned including VS-35, which would be reestablished again for the fourth time in the 1990 under a new nickname.

References 

Carrier Air Wings
United States Navy
Military units and formations disestablished in 1988